Relaxation labelling is an image treatment methodology. Its goal is to associate a label to the pixels of a given image or nodes of a given graph.

See also
Digital image processing

References

Further reading



Computer vision